Rocknoceros is an American children's band formed in Fairfax, Virginia, United States in 2005.  The band consists of two members, both childhood friends: Marc "Boogie Woogie Bennie" Capponi and Patrick "Williebob" Williams.  A third, founding member, David "Coach" Cotton, retired from the band effective January 1, 2020.  Rocknoceros has performed at many venues, including Lollapalooza, Austin City Limits, Wolf Trap, and The Kennedy Center.  Their fifth album, "Plymouth Rockers", was released in June 2015.

Media

Discography
Rocknoceros (2006)
Dark Side of the Moon Bounce (2007)
PINK! (2009)
Colonel Purple Turtle (2011)
Plymouth Rockers (2015)
Happy Holidays from Rocknoceros (2015)

Podcast
Rocknoceros began publishing a podcast, the "Rocknoceros Podnoceros", in August 2017.

References

External links
Official website
WAMU 88.5 - Kojo Nnamdi Show

Musical groups from Virginia
American children's musical groups
Musical groups established in 2005